The Handley Page Hendon was a British torpedo bomber of the 1920s. A two-seat development of Handley Page's earlier single-seat Hanley, the Hendon was a single-engine biplane. While six aircraft were purchased by the British Air Ministry for evaluation and trials purposes, no further production ensued and the Hendon did not enter squadron service.

Development and design
While the single-seat Handley Page Hanley had lost to the similar Blackburn Dart in fulfilling the requirements for a carrier-based torpedo bomber to equip Britain's Fleet Air Arm, it was recognised by both Handley Page and the Air Ministry that a two-seat aircraft would be more useful both for operational purposes and for experimental work. An order was therefore placed on 27 November 1923 for six two-seat derivatives of the Hanley III, designated the Type Ta (later known as the H.P.25) or Handley Page Hendon to meet the requirements of Air Ministry Specification 25/23 for an interim torpedo bomber.

The first of the six aircraft to fly, (serial N9724) flew on 7 July 1924, with the remaining five flying by September. It had a longer fuselage to accommodate the observer, who was provided with a .303 in (7.7 mm) Lewis Gun on a Scarff ring mounting, but initially, was similar to the Hanley III. Tests showed that it was tailheavy when carrying a torpedo, the outer wings being swept back by six degrees to avoid this.

Operational history
The six Hendons were used for extensive trials to investigate various configurations of leading edge slots/slats. These allowed one aircraft to successfully land on  while carrying a torpedo and without using arrestor gear. No further production occurred, the development of automatic slots in October 1927 making the Hendon obsolete.

Variants
Hendon I
Initial configuration. Leading edge slots as Hanley III. Six built.
Hendon II
Improved slot gear. Three converted.
Hendon III
Slotted Flaps. One converted from Hendon II.

Specifications (Hendon)

See also

References

Notes

Bibliography

Barnes, C.H. Handley Page Aircraft since 1907. London:Putnam, 1976. .
Mason, Francis K. The British Bomber since 1914. London:Putnam, 1994. .
Lewis, Peter. The British Bomber since 1914. London:Putnam, Third edition, 1980. .
"The Handley Page “Hendon”". Flight. 29 July 1926. Page 459–461.

External links

H.P.25 Hendon

1920s British bomber aircraft
Hendon
Carrier-based aircraft